This is a list of results for all the matches played from 1951 to 2010 by the São Paulo state football team.

Sources:

Results

References

São Paulo state football team results